Perfume (German: Parfum) is a German television series produced for ZDFneo that was released on November 14, 2018. The series is both inspired by the novel of the same name by Patrick Süskind and the 2006 film Perfume: The Story of a Murderer by Tom Tykwer but is set in the modern day. Netflix acquired worldwide airing rights outside of German-speaking Europe for the crime series. The series was released on Netflix on December 21, 2018. In general, the international reviews have been very positive.

Plot
On the Lower Rhine, the corpse of a woman is found whose red hair, pubic, and armpit hair have been removed. The investigators Nadja Simon and Matthias Köhler and prosecutor Grünberg, with whom Nadja has an affair, encounter five former boarding school students who know the victim from their school days and experimented with human scents back then, inspired by the novel Perfume. In addition, the unresolved case of a missing boy comes into focus. When his body is found, he has the same mutilations as the red-haired victim. A prostitute is also found murdered, disfigured in the same way. Meanwhile, Nadja learns that she is pregnant by Grünberg. He is not ready to leave his wife, and he wants her to obtain an abortion. When his mistress refuses to end her pregnancy, however, he ends the relationship with her.

Cast

Episodes

References

External links
 
 

German drama television series
Serial drama television series